Nattokinase (pronounced ) is an enzyme extracted and purified from a Japanese food called nattō. Nattō is produced by fermentation by adding the bacterium Bacillus natto, which also produces the enzyme, to boiled soybeans. While other soy foods contain enzymes, it is only the nattō preparation that contains the specific nattokinase enzyme.

In spite of its name, nattokinase is not a kinase enzyme (and should not be pronounced as such), but a serine protease of the subtilisin family (99.5% identical with aprE). Rather, it is named for the fact that it is an enzyme produced by nattōkin (納豆菌), the Japanese name for Bacillus subtilis  var natto. When in contact with human blood or blood clots, it exhibits a strong fibrinolytic activity and works by inactivating plasminogen activator inhibitor 1 (PAI-1). Although it should be expected to be digested and inactivated in the human gut like other proteins, a few researchers report that nattokinase is active when taken orally.

Nattokinase is sold as a dietary supplement. It can now be produced by recombinant means and in batch culture, rather than relying on extraction from nattō. There are three well-known manufacturers around the world: Contek Life Science, Daiwa Pharmaceutical, and the Japanese Nattokinase Association organized by Japan Bio Science Laboratory.

See also 
 Proteases (medical and related uses)

References

External links 
 Japan Functional Food Research Association

Enzymes
Japanese cuisine